"Don't Let Him Know" is a song by Canadian rock band Prism, written by Jim Vallance and Bryan Adams. It was the first single from the band's fifth studio album, Small Change (1981). "Don't Let Him Know" was Prism's biggest US hit, peaking at No. 1 on the Mainstream Rock chart  and No. 39 on the Billboard Hot 100. As a single it reached No. 49 on the Canadian Singles chart.

The song and footage of the band performing were later used in a commercial for Craig car stereos.

Personnel
Prism
 Henry Small – lead vocals
 Lindsay Mitchell – guitar
 Rocket Norton – drums
 Al Harlow – bass guitar

Sales chart performance

Re-recorded version
In 2009, Prism re-recorded "Don't Let Him Know" with Al Harlow on lead vocals.

See also
 List of Billboard Mainstream Rock number-one songs of the 1980s

References

External links
 

1981 songs
1982 singles
Prism (band) songs
Songs written by Jim Vallance
Songs written by Bryan Adams
Columbia Records singles
Capitol Records singles